Quickline (also known as Signature Service) is a bus rapid transit service owned and operated by the Metropolitan Transit Authority of Harris County (METRO). The Quickline service began on June 1, 2009 with the 402 route (also called the QL2 route), which supplements the 2-Bellaire route, which was the most heavily used bus route in the METRO system, with that title now belonging to the 82-Westheimer.  Both routes run along Bellaire Boulevard.

System features

The Quickline system features upgraded buses, fewer stops, and more modern and comfortable bus stops. The bus stops resemble those featured along the METRORail Red Line, with announced arrival times for upcoming buses based on GPS tracking systems. In addition, the buses are equipped with control devices that will interact with the traffic signal system at intersections to allow the buses to have priority movement along the route. The service uses 40-ft long hybrid-electric buses, purchased from New Flyer Corporation, that provide on-board security cameras, more comfortable seating, a quieter interior and a significant amount of passenger information to be provided at the stops along the route. To help distinguish the service from regular METRO buses, the Quickline buses have a distinctive blue bus wrap on the exterior with the "Quickline" insignia and route map applied.

402 QL Bellaire

This route is the first of many Quickline bus routes planned by METRO. The QL 402 route only operates during peak traffic hours in the mornings and afternoons, on 15-minute intervals, Monday through Friday; it has now been expanded to include midday service. The 9-mile route only uses 8 stops on the 2-Bellaire route, facilitating significant time savings from the west side of Houston to the Texas Medical Center. In addition, these 8 stops were selected so that transfers to existing METRO local service bus routes could be performed more efficiently. The estimated length of the trip from Ranchester Station to the TMC Transit Center Station is 38 minutes.

Stations
The following is a list of stations and connections for the 402 Quickline, listed in order from west to east.  Frequent bus service bolded.

Future expansion
Before breaking ground on any future Quickline routes, METRO has pledged to grade the ridership of the QL2 route. In addition, the transportation agency will survey passengers periodically to gain their opinion of the service and will monitor ridership as a measure of success. Since then, METRO has stated that Quickline routes could potentially be implemented on other heavily used routes planned around Houston, such as Westheimer, Airline, Beechnut, Antoine and Gessner.

References

Metropolitan Transit Authority of Harris County
Bus rapid transit in Texas